The Evergreen School, at 100 City School Dr. in Evergreen, Alabama, was listed on the National Register of Historic Places in 2016.

It is a one-story brick Classical Revival-style building which was built in 1923 and expanded in c.1935 and 1948.

References

External links

Schools in Alabama
National Register of Historic Places in Conecuh County, Alabama
School buildings completed in 1923
Neoclassical architecture in Alabama
1923 establishments in Alabama